Bossa Ticaret ve Sanayi Isletmeleri T.A.S. is a Turkish textile corporation. Bossa's shares are listed on Borsa Istanbul since 1995. 88% of the total amount of shares are owned by Mr. Israfil Ucurum and Mr. Yusuf Ucurum.

Business and activities
Bossa continue to maintain its leadership position in the industry with its high quality, innovative, differentiated product range, customer-oriented products and services tailored to its clients’ specific needs, fast delivery, widespread market network structure, effective price policies and high customer satisfaction. Established in 1951, Bossa is one of the largest integrated textile corporations of Turkey with its facility in Adana. Bossa offers denim and sportswear fabrics with an annual total production capacity of 50 million meters. One of the core strengths of company is the powerful and long-lasting relationship established with prominent brands and designers globally. Bossa is proud to present novelty, trends and outstanding products to all its customers.

References

Companies listed on the Istanbul Stock Exchange